Tomás Alberto González Vera (born 21 December 1977), is a Paraguayan footballer. He played twice in Chile: once for Rangers in 1999, and the other for Cobreloa, ten years later.

History

Cobreloa
González has eight matches of the eleven matches than the team has played in total and in the Copa Chile. González also has played one and the only match for the copa chile against Deportes Antofagasta they lost 2–1 on that occasion that meant that despite it lost a classic also was eliminated of the cup.

Paraguay
Tomás González in Paraguay has played in clubs as Club Cerro Corá, Club Olimpia, 12 de Octubre, Sportivo Luqueño, General Caballero ZC, Silvio Pettirossi and 2 de Mayo, before arrives to Chile has to play to Cobreloa.

External links 
BDFA profile

1977 births
Living people
Paraguayan footballers
Paraguayan expatriate footballers
Paraguay international footballers
Paraguay under-20 international footballers
General Caballero Sport Club footballers
Silvio Pettirossi footballers
Sportivo Luqueño players
12 de Octubre Football Club players
Cerro Corá footballers
2 de Mayo footballers
Club Olimpia footballers
Rangers de Talca footballers
Cobreloa footballers
Expatriate footballers in Chile
Association football midfielders